Dance Dance Revolution Dance Wars, stylized Dance Dance Revolution DANCE WARS and sometimes abbreviated as DDR Dance Wars, is the most recent home release of Dance Dance Revolution, and the third one to be released in iOS. The game stopped functioning at September 1, 2013 due to the team retiring from online.

Gameplay
Dance Dance Revolution Dance Wars retains its core gameplay: matching the hit of arrow according to the song's timing. There are basically two game mode players can choose: Battle Mode and Free Play Mode. The heart of this game is Battle Mode, where players can match against other player or aiding players through Dance Crew system. Players have ability to build Dance Crew by recruiting other people. By having Dance Crew, players may do a Practice Battle and Crew Battle while also aiding or having other Crew member aiding players during battle. Respect Points may be earned through Dance Crew to obtain or upgrade skills and buying items.
Dance Dance Revolution Dance Wars implements what is to be called as "Stamina", a representation of the energy used in Battles and Missions. It can be refilled by eating foods or using items that can refill stamina, although Practice Battle and playing songs in Free Play Mode don't affect the Stamina.

Unlocks
There are several ways to obtain unlockables. Note that these unlockables is not just songs, but also items, accessories for characters and characters themselves.
 Invitation. Inviting certain numbers of people to play Dance Dance Revolution Dance Wars may give players unlockables.
 Missions. Players are required to accomplish various Missions to obtain unlockables. Also, if players have downloaded jukebeat, they may also obtain three songs from jukebeat.
 Crew Battle. Crew Battle is a cooperative battle where players aims for "Stickers", part of a song banner. Player may obtain Stickers through battle and or placing Traps for other rivals. If a set of Stickers are obtained, the song will be unlocked.
 Event. In-game events will give players unlockables. 
 The current Event, Unidentified Funky Objects (announced February 25, 2013), lets players to unlock the song Unidentified Funky Objects, among other unlockables. The event itself is divided into four chapters, with the objective to clear the song Unidentified Funky Objects in a fixed difficulty (Chapter 1 show players the Beginner chart, Chapter 2 the Basic chart, and so on).

Development
In 2012, KONAMI announced their third installment of DDR in iOS system under the name "Dance Dance Revolution GREE", hinting the ability to use GREE in this installment. It was announced to be released in February 2012, but no news were available since then.
However, it was announced again on December 14, 2012 that the game would be released under the title "Dance Dance Revolution Dance Wars" and would be the first installment in iOS to make use of GREE system, meaning that it would incorporate online and multiplayer gameplay. It was released on February 14, 2013.

Music
There are currently 53 songs in Dance Dance Revolution Dance Wars, including the a-ha pack that is released at the same time as the release of the game.

References

External links
 DanceDance Revolution DANCE WARS GREE Page.

2013 video games
Dance Dance Revolution games
Bemani games
Video game franchises
Konami franchises
IOS games
IOS-only games
Video games developed in Japan